Thoros II, Prince of Armenia, also known as Toros II the Great or Thoros II the Great, (unknown – February 6, 1169) was the sixth Lord of Armenian Cilicia from the Rubenid dynasty from 1144/1145–1169. Referred to as the “Lord of the Mountains”

Thoros (together with his father, Leo I and his brother, Roupen) was taken captive and imprisoned in Constantinople in 1137 after the Byzantine Emperor John II Comnenus during his campaign against Cilicia and the Principality of Antioch, successfully had laid siege to Gaban and Vahka (currently, Feke in Turkey). All Cilicia remained under Byzantine rule for eight years.

Unlike his father and brother, Thoros survived his incarceration in Constantinople and was able to escape in 1143. Whatever the conditions in which Thoros entered Cilicia, he found it occupied by many Greek garrisons. He rallied around him the Armenians in the eastern parts of Cilicia and after a persistent and relentless pursuit of the Greeks, he successfully ousted the Byzantine garrisons from Pardzerpert (now Andırın in Turkey), Vahka, Sis (today Kozan in Turkey), Anazarbus, Adana, Mamistra and eventually Tarsus. His victories were aided by the lack of Muslim attacks in Cilicia and from the setbacks the Greeks and the Crusaders suffered on the heels of the Siege of Edessa in 1144.

Emperor Manuel I Comnenus, unhappy with Thoros's progress in the areas still claimed by the Byzantine Empire, sought peaceful means to settle his conflict with Thoros, but his attempts bore him no fruits. The recovery before 1150 of the Taurus fortresses by Thoros had not seriously affected Greek power, but his conquest of Mamistra in 1151 and the rest of Cilicia in 1152 had necessitated a great expedition. As a result, during the course of the next 20 years there were no fewer than three separate military campaigns launched by the emperor against Thoros, but each campaign was only able to produce a limited success.

Thoros's accomplishments during his reign placed Armenian Cilicia on a firm footing.

His early years 
Thoros was the second son of Leo I, lord of Armenian Cilicia. The name and the origin of his mother are not known with certainty. It is possible that she was a daughter of Count Hugh I of Rethel, or she may have been the daughter of Gabriel of Melitene.

In 1136, Leo I (Thoros's father) was made prisoner by Baldwin of Marash who sent him off to captivity in Antioch. In his absence, his three sons quarreled; the eldest, Constantine, was eventually captured and blinded by his brothers. After two months of confinement, Leo I obtained his liberty by consenting to harsh terms.

In the early summer of 1137, Emperor John II Comnenus came to Cilicia with a full force on his way to take Antioch; his army successively retook Seleucia, Korikos, Tarsus, Mamistra, Adana, Tel Hamdoun (now Toprakkale in Turkey) and Anazarbus. Leo I took refuge in the Taurus Mountains, but at last found the situation hopeless, and surrendered himself to the conqueror; Thoros and his youngest brother, Roupen were also taken captive together with their father. They were dragged away to Constantinople, where Leo I died in imprisonment in 1141. Roupen, after being blinded, was assassinated by the Greeks.

His rule

The liberation of Armenian Cilicia 
Thoros escaped from Constantinople about the year 1143; he fled to the island of Cyprus, which was then under Byzantine suzerainty, aboard a Venetian vessel and then found his way to Antioch. He took refuge at the Court of his cousin, Count Joscelin II of Edessa. From there, in the company of a few trusted comrades, he was assisted by a Syrian priest, who led them by night to a safe shelter by the river Pyramus (now Ceyhan River in Turkey).

They then crossed the Amanus range (now Nur Mountains in Turkey) and reached the mountainous Armenian strongholds in the Taurus Mountains where Thoros began gathering a new following. He recaptured the family stronghold of Vahka and two of his brothers, Stephen and Mleh joined him. He made friends with a neighboring Frankish lord, Simon of Raban, whose daughter he married.

The first Byzantine attack against Cilicia 
In 1151, while the Byzantines were distracted by the Moslem attack on Turbessel, Thoros swept down into the Cilician plain and defeated and slew the Byzantine governor, Thomas, at the gates of Mamistra. Emperor Manuel I at once sent his cousin Andronicus Comnenus with an army to recover the territory lost to Thoros. But Thoros was well prepared for the unsuspecting Greeks and consequently won a decisive victory at the Battle of Mamistra in 1152. As Andronicus Comnenus moved up to besiege Thoros at Mamistra, the Armenians made a sudden sortie and caught him unawares. His army was routed and he fled back in disgrace to Constantinople.

In the meantime, the Hethumids, who were pro-Byzantine sympathizers, did not overlook any opportunity for engaging in an anti-Roupenian armed conflict. Andronicus Comnenus's mission was such an opportunity but it was not an occasion for glory: many of their numbers were killed by Thoros's aggressive strategy, and many more were taken into captivity. Among the captives were the two illustrious members, Oshin II of Lampron and his son Hethum. Oshin II was eventually released for a ransom but his son was kept as hostage; but Thoros arranged the marriage of his daughter to Hethum and returned half the ransom money to the groom's father Oshin II of Lampron.

Wars with the Seljuks and Antioch 
Emperor Manuel I Comnenus persuaded the Seljuk sultan of Rûm, Mesud I, to attack Thoros and demand his submission to the Sultan's suzerainty. However, the ensuing Seljuk attack, which in fact was provoked by an Armenian raid into Seljuk lands in Cappadocia in the winter of 1154, was routed successfully by Thoros in collaboration with a contingent of the Knights Templar.

Then the emperor turned to Antioch for help; he offered to recognize the new prince, Raynald of Châtillon, if the Franks of Antioch would fight for him against Thoros; he also promised a money-subsidy if the work were properly done. Raynald willingly complied as the Armenians had advanced into the district of Alexandretta (now İskenderun in Turkey) which the Franks claimed as part of the Principality of Antioch.

After a short battle near Alexendretta, Raynald drove the Armenian back into Cilicia; and he presented the re-conquered country to the Knights Templar. Other view is that after the battle Raynald was forced to return home, covered with humiliation; and later on, Thoros voluntarily surrendered to the brethren the fortresses in question, and the Knights in turn took oath “to assist the Armenians on all occasions where they needed help.” In 1156, the Jacobites were allowed to build a new cathedral in Antioch, at whose dedication Constance of Antioch and Thoros assisted.

Having secured the land that he wanted, Raynald demanded his subsidies from the emperor who refused them, pointing out that the main task had yet to be done. Raynald quickly sided with Thoros and conspired to attack Cyprus; and the Armenians attacked the few remaining Byzantine fortresses in Cilicia.

The sack of Cyprus 
In the spring of 1156, Raynald of Châtillon and Thoros made a sudden landing on Cyprus. Thoros and Raynald both conducted widespread plundering of the island. The Franks and Armenians marched up and down the island robbing and pillaging every building that they saw, churches and convents as well as shops and private houses. The crops were burnt; the herds were rounded up, together with all the population, and driven down to the coast.

The nightmare lasted about three weeks; then, on the rumor of an imperial fleet in the offing, Raynald gave the order for re-embarkation. The ships were loaded up with booty; and every Cypriot was forced to ransom himself.

In the meantime, Thoros quickly established a friendly rapport with Kilij Arslan II, the new Seljuk sultan of Rûm, and in 1158 a peace treaty was concluded.

The second Byzantine attack against Cilicia 
In the summer of 1158, Manuel I Comnenus launched his second assault on Thoros; at the head of an army, he marched down the usual routes leading to Seleucia. There, with a small rapid deployment force of horsemen and Seleucian troops, he launched a surprise attack on Thoros. Thoros was at Tarsus, suspecting nothing, when suddenly, one day in late October, a Latin pilgrim whom he had entertained came rushing back to his Court to tell him that he had seen Imperial troops only a day's march away. Thoros collected his family, his intimate friends and his treasure and fled at once to the mountains.

Next day the Emperor Manuel entered the Cilician plain; within a fortnight all the Cilician cities as far as Anazarbus were in his power. But Thoros himself still eluded him.  While Byzantine detachments scoured the valleys he fled from hill-top to hill-top and at last found refuge on a crag called Dadjog, near the sources of the river Cydnus; only his two most trusted servants knew where he lay hidden. Thus much of Cilicia was restored back to Byzantine control, but Thoros still held the mountainous regions in the north.

Eventually, Baldwin III of Jerusalem intervened and successfully brokered a peace treaty between the emperor and Thoros: Thoros had to walk barefoot and bareheaded to the camp of the emperor; there he prostrated himself in the dust before the imperial platform. The pardon was accorded to him for his transgressions both in Cilicia and Cyprus, and still allowed to hold partial possession in Cilicia.

The murder of his brother 

Thoros's brother, Stephen, ignoring Thoros's official pledges to Manuel I.  With the help of a few of his supporters, he continued attacking Greek garrisons thus giving Andronicus Euphorbenus, the Byzantine governor stationed in Tarsus, the opportunity to sabotage the treaty. Stephen was invited to a banquet held in the governor's residence where he was seized upon arrival, and his mutilated corpse was flung over the gates of Tarsus.

Thoros, who had his own reasons for desiring Stephen's murder, accused of Andronicus Euphorbenus of complicity and swept down on Mamistra, Anazarbus and Vahka, surprising and murdering the Greek garrisons. Eventually, reconciliation with the emperor was negotiated through the mediation of king Amalric I of Jerusalem.  Andronicus Euphorbenus was recalled and replaced by Konstantinos Kalamanos as the new Byzantine governor in Tarsus.

In alliance with the crusaders 

In 1164, when Nur ad-Din, the emir of Aleppo, knew that Amalric I had left for Egypt, he struck at the Principality of Antioch and laid siege to the key fortress of Harenc. Prince Bohemond III of Antioch called upon Count Raymond III of Tripoli, Thoros and Konstantinos Kalamanos to come to his rescue. At the news of their coming, Nur ad-Din raised the siege; as he retired, Bohemond decided to follow in pursuit. The armies made contact on 10 August 1164 at the battle of Harim, near Artah. Ignoring a warning from Thoros, Bohemond attacked at once, and when the Muslims feigned flight rushed headlong after them, only to fall into an ambush. Thoros and his brother Mleh who had been more cautious, escaped from the battlefield.

Around that time (in 1164 or in 1167) Thoros visited Jerusalem and suggested the colonization of a large number of Armenians, but the Latin prelates forced Amalric I to refuse the offer by their insistence that they should pay the dime (a special tax).

The third Byzantine attack against Cilicia
Intermittent fighting erupted everywhere, harassing the Greek forces throughout Cilicia. In 1168, emperor Manuel I, obsessed with his dilemma with Thoros, marched his armies into Cilicia for the third time under the command of Konstantinos Kalamanos. But Kalamanos was able to produce only limited successes which in the end induced Byzantium to renounce its right of possession of the whole of Cilicia so long as it had access to the ports of the Gulf of Alexandretta. Byzantium also disclaimed all rights to direct government of Cilicia and accepted in settlement only Thoros's recognition of Byzantine suzerainty.

His last years 

Thoros quarreled with his brother Mleh who attempting to assassinate him fled to Nur ed-Din and became a Moslim.

Thoros, weary after nearly quarter of a century of rule and warfare, abdicated in favor of his young son Roupen II, who was placed under the guardianship of Thoros's father-in-law, the Regent Thomas. After his abdication, Thoros became a monk.

He died in 1169. He was buried in the monastery of Drazark.

Marriages and children
 c. 1149 An unnamed daughter of Simon of Raban (or, according to other views, Isabelle, daughter of Count Joscelin II of Edessa)
Rita (c. 1150 – after 1168/1169), the wife of Hethum III of Lampron
Irene, the wife of Isaac Komnenus of Cyprus
 c. 1164 An unnamed daughter of the future regent Thomas
Roupen II of Cilicia (c. 1165 – Hromgla, 1170)

Footnotes

Sources 

Edwards, Robert W.: The Fortifications of Armenian Cilicia, Dumbarton Oaks Studies XXIII, Dumbarton Oaks: Trustees for Harvard University, 1987, Washington, D.C.;   
Ghazarian, Jacob G: The Armenian Kingdom in Cilicia during the Crusades: The Integration of Cilician Armenians with the Latins (1080–1393); RoutledgeCurzon (Taylor & Francis Group), 2000, Abingdon;

External links
Smbat Sparapet's Chronicle
The Barony of Cilician Armenia (Kurkjian's History of Armenia, Ch. 27)

1169 deaths
Christians of the Second Crusade
Year of birth unknown
12th-century Armenian people
Monarchs of the Rubenid dynasty
12th-century births